Biber may refer to:

 Biber (surname)
 Biber (geology), a timespan in the glacial history of the Alps
 Biber (submarine), a World War II German midget submarine
 Biber, a bridge-carrying version of the German Leopard 1 tank
 Biber (LaTeX), a BibTeX replacement for users of Biblatex
 Biber (Switzerland) (also spelled Biberli), a traditional Swiss gingerbread confection 
 Urfa Biber, Turkish dried pepper
 Biber salçası, paste made from chili peppers and salt
 Biber (magazine), Austrian news magazine for immigrants

Rivers
 Biber (Alp), a river in Switzerland, tributary to the Alp
 Biber (Danube), a river in Bavaria, Germany, tributary to the Danube
 Biber (Möhne), a river in North Rhine-Westphalia, Germany, tributary of the Möhne
 Biber (Rhine), a river in Germany and Switzerland, tributary to the Rhine
 Biber (Schleuse), a river in Thuringia, Germany, tributary to the Schleuse (Weser basin)

See also
 Beber (disambiguation)
 Bieber (disambiguation)
 Related surnames
 Bóbr
 Buber
 Bobrowski